Mario Beshiraj (born 25 October 1999) is an Albanian footballer who currently plays as a forward for Partizani Tirana in the Albanian Superliga.

Honours
Tirana
 Albanian Superliga: 2019–20, 2021–22

References

1999 births
Living people
People from Tirana County
People from Tirana
Footballers from Tirana
Albanian footballers
Association football forwards
KF Tirana players
Kategoria Superiore players
Ermis Aradippou FC players
Cypriot First Division players